Juju (1970) was the first album recorded by the rock band Gass and featured guitarist Peter Green, who had just left Fleetwood Mac at this time. The album was released by Polydor (catalogue reference 283-022 A) and withdrawn soon after it was released to retail outlets and re-issued entitled Gass

Track listing
"Kulu Se Mama" (McClean, Harper, Tench) - 7:00
"Holy Woman" (McClean, Harper, Tench) - 5:36
"Yes I Can" (McClean, Harper, Tench) - 6:43
"Juju" (McClean, Harper, Tench) - 3:31
"Black Velvet" (McClean, Harper, Tench) - 3:41
"House for Sale" (McClean, Harper, Tench) - 3:39
"Cold Light of Day" (Derek Austin) - 4:04
"Cool Me Down" (McClean, Harper, Tench) - 6:03 

Track times are included on the German issue of this album (Polydor 2383 022).

Personnel
 Robert Tench- vocals, percussion; guitar on "Holy Woman"; organ solo on "Kulu Se Mama"
 Michael Piggott - violin, guitar
 Derek Austin - organ, piano, flute, percussion
 Delisle Harper - electric and acoustic basses, percussion
 Godfrey McLean - drums, percussion, congas; vocals on "Yes I Can" and "Cool Me Down"
Other musicians
 Junior Kerr-guitar
 Errol McLean - congas 
 Humphrey Okah - saxophone 
 Alan Roskans - lead guitar 
 Frank Clark - organ 
 Peter Green - guitar (on "Juju" and "Black Velvet")

References

Further reading
Hjort, Chris and Hinman, Doug. Jeff's book : A chronology of Jeff Beck's Career 1965-1980 : from the Yardbirds to Jazz-Rock. Rock 'n' Roll Research Press, (2000). 
Joynson, Vernon. The Tapestry of Delights - The Comprehensive Guide to British Music of the Beat, R&B, Psychedelic and Progressive Eras 1963-1976. Borderline (2006). Reprinted (2008).

External links
http://www.alexgitlin.com/npp/gass.htm

1970 debut albums
Polydor Records albums
Gass (band) albums
Albums produced by Mel Collins